Sant Josep is a railway station on the Llobregat–Anoia Line. It is located underneath Avinguda Carrilet, between Carrer de Miquel Romeu and Carrer de Mestre Candi, in the L'Hospitalet de Llobregat municipality, to the south-west of Barcelona, in Catalonia, Spain. It is served by Barcelona Metro line 8, Baix Llobregat Metro lines S33, S4 and S8, and commuter rail lines R5, R6, R50 and R60.

External links

 Information and photos of the station at trenscat.cat 
 Information and photos of the station at WEFER 
 Video on train operations at the station on YouTube

Railway stations in Spain opened in 1912
Barcelona Metro line 8 stations
Stations on the Llobregat–Anoia Line
Railway stations in L'Hospitalet de Llobregat
Railway stations located underground in Spain